The Final Word with Rico Hizon (or simply The Final Word) is CNN Philippines' flagship late-night news program. The show first aired on April 20, 2020, as a replacement to the network's 9pm edition of Newsroom. The show is anchored by the network's Senior Anchor and Director for News Content Development, Rico Hizon, who has come home to the Philippines after a 25-year overseas news stint with CNBC Asia and BBC News.

Background
The hour-long newscast, which airs every Monday through Friday from 9:00-10:00 p.m., focuses on the most significant news stories of the day from the Philippines and around the world, as well as segments which also feature the lighter side of the news. Hizon earlier said that the show's formula gives "overall view of what’s happening in the Philippines, around the world, and at the end, give them a sense of hope, inspire them that there is still a light at the end of the tunnel."

The show also features live reports from various CNN and CNN International correspondents from across the globe, with prominent ones going live for the newscast such as Nic Robertson, Richard Quest, Matthew Chance, Will Ripley, David Culver, Joe Johns, and Nadia Romero, to name a few.

Special editions
When warranted, The Final Word would air special editions of the newscast. Its first (and only, so far) special edition was during the July 27, 2020, State of the Nation Address of President Rodrigo Duterte, where the newscast aired a special hour-long edition. Correspondents delivered live and packaged reports about the SONA, while BDO's chief market strategist Jonathan Ravelas provided business analysis. Senator Richard Gordon was also interviewed live on the show.

The edition was on the heels of Hizon anchoring the network's SONA coverage for the first time, and his first SONA coverage in the Philippines since 1995. Hizon anchored a cumulative 7 hours that day – starting with the network's 2pm coverage where he joined Chief Correspondent and Anchor Pia Hontiveros and Senior Anchor and Correspondent Pinky Webb until the President's speech ended and for a post-SONA analysis with ADR Stratbase analyst Dindo Manhit and former Presidential Spokesperson Edwin Lacierda.

COVID-19 pandemic
On July 7, 2020, production of The Final Word, alongside many other shows, was temporarily halted due to a coronavirus infection in the network's headquarters in Mandaluyong. Hizon took to social media to continue the newscast. The show was brought back on the air by July 13 after thorough disinfection in the network's premises, allowing the show to be broadcast on television once again.

Anchor

Main Anchor
 Rico Hizon (2020–present)

Segment Presenter
 Andrei Felix (since 2020, Sports Desk)

Substitute Anchors
 David Santos (CNN Philippines Senior Correspondent)
 Ruth Cabal (CNN Philippines Anchor and Senior Correspondent)
 Mai Rodriguez
 Menchu Antigua-Macapagal

Segments
Buy. Sell. Hold. (Business)
Sports Desk (Sports)
Hollywood Minute (Entertainment)

Awards
 Asian Academy Creative Awards – National Winner (Philippines) – Best News Programme (2020)

See also
 List of programs broadcast by CNN Philippines

References

Philippine television news shows
CNN Philippines original programming
CNN Philippines
CNN Philippines News and Current Affairs
English-language television shows
2020s Philippine television series
2020 Philippine television series debuts
Flagship evening news shows